Pedrinho is a Portuguese nickname for people named Pedro, meaning "little Pedro".

Notable people with the nickname include:

Brazil
 Pedrinho (football manager), coached the national team in 1957
 Pedrinho (footballer, born 1957), defender
 Pedrinho (footballer, born 1973), forward
 Pedrinho (footballer, born 1976), midfielder
 Pedrinho (footballer, born 1977), midfielder
 Pedrinho (footballer, born 1986), forward
 Pedrinho (footballer, born 1993), midfielder
 Pedrinho (footballer, born May 1994), attacking midfielder
 Pedrinho (footballer, born November 1994), forward
 Pedrinho (footballer, born January 1998), defensive midfielder
 Pedrinho (footballer, born April 1998), attacking midfielder
 Pedrinho (footballer, born 1999), forward
 Pedrinho (footballer, born 2002), left-back
 Pedrinho Gaúcho (1953–2019), football forward
 Pedrinho Sousa (born 1990), football goalkeeper

Portugal
 Pedrinho (footballer, born 1985), defender
 Pedrinho (footballer, born 1992), midfielder
 Pedrinho Rodrigues (born 1997), football forward